Angel in a Devil's Body is a Czech comedy film directed by Václav Matějka. It was released in 1983.

Cast
 Zdena Studenková - Renáta
 Božidara Turzonovová - Madam
 Karel Heřmánek - Bulis
 Miloš Kopecký - Boura
 Radoslav Brzobohatý - Sulc
 Josef Vinklář - Nikodým
 Jiří Korn - Artur
 Josef Větrovec - First
 Jan Hartl - Justic

External links
 

1983 films
Czechoslovak comedy films
1983 comedy films
Films directed by Václav Matějka
Czech comedy films
1980s Czech-language films
1980s Czech films